Alaena bicolora is a butterfly in the family Lycaenidae. It is found from eastern to south-western Tanzania. The habitat consists of rocky areas in woodland.

References

Butterflies described in 1924
Alaena
Endemic fauna of Tanzania
Butterflies of Africa
Taxa named by George Thomas Bethune-Baker